Ian Bogost is an American academic and video game designer, most known for the game Cow Clicker. He holds a joint professorship at Washington University as director and professor of the Film and Media Studies program in Arts & Sciences and the McKelvey School of Engineering. He previously held a joint professorship in  the School of Literature, Media, and Communication and in Interactive Computing in the College of Computing at the Georgia Institute of Technology, where he was the Ivan Allen College of Liberal Arts Distinguished Chair in Media Studies.

He is the author of Alien Phenomenology or What It's Like to be a Thing and Unit Operations: An Approach to Videogame Criticism and Persuasive Games: The Expressive Power of Videogames and the co-author of Racing the Beam: The Atari Video Computer System and Newsgames: Journalism at Play. His Atari 2600 game, A Slow Year, won two awards, Vanguard and Virtuoso, at IndieCade 2010. Bogost has released many other games, including Cow Clicker, a satire and critique of the influx of social network games. He is a frequent contributer to The Atlantic.

Education
Bogost received his bachelor's in Philosophy and Comparative Literature from the University of Southern California in 1998. He then went on to get his masters in Comparative Literature from the University of California, Los Angeles (UCLA) in 2001, and received his doctorate in Comparative Literature from UCLA in 2004.

Professional career
In 2008, Bogost became an associate professor in the School of Literature, Communication, and Culture at the Georgia Institute of Technology. In 2010, he was appointed Director of the Graduate Program in Digital Media, a position he held until 2012. In 2011, Bogost became a professor of Digital Media and an adjunct professor of Interactive Computing. In 2012, he was named the Ivan Allen College Distinguished Chair in Media Studies and a professor of Interactive Computing, both positions he still holds. With Christopher Schaberg, he is co-editor of the series Object Lessons from Bloomsbury Publishing.

His book Alien Phenomenology or What It's Like to be a Thing (University of Minnesota Press, 2012) critiques aspects of Bruno Latour's actor-network theory.

In 2021, Bogost quit his job at the Georgia Institute of Technology partly because of the university's lack of COVID-19 protection requirements. He took a joint professorship at Washington University where he serves as director and professor of the Film and Media Studies program in Arts & Sciences and the McKelvey School of Engineering.

Bogost was a co-founder of the game studio Persuasive Games, for which he is currently the chief designer.

Honors and awards
Winner, Vanguard & Virtuoso Awards, Indiecade Festival 2010 (for A Slow Year).
Finalist, Indiecade Festival 2010 (for A Slow Year).

Games

Bibliography
 
  (anthology, edited by Daniel Goldberg and Linus Larsson) (Bogost contributed the article "The Squalid Grace of Flappy Bird")
 
 
 
 
 
  2nd edition (with Nick Montfort)

References

External links

Ian Bogost talks about Serious Games at XML
Bio at The Art History of Games Conference

Georgia Tech faculty
Place of birth missing (living people)
Year of birth missing (living people)
American video game designers
Living people
Video game researchers
21st-century American philosophers
American mass media scholars
Browser game developers
Washington University in St. Louis faculty
University of Southern California alumni
University of California, Los Angeles alumni
American male non-fiction writers